Johnny Gray (born 1953) is a retired NHRA drag racer and oil company executive.  Since 2021, he has been a partner in Team DGR, an American professional stock car racing team that competes in the NASCAR Camping World Truck Series and the ARCA Menards Series, for which his grandsons Tanner and Taylor Gray compete.

Racing career

Drag racing
The elder Gray has been racing in various forms of motorsports for nearly half a century; he began drag racing in the early 1990s, climbing the ladder from the National Hot Rod Association's Competition Eliminator division to Pro Stock and later, the Funny Car category with Don Schumacher Racing.
Gray retired in 2013 to support the Pro Stock efforts of his son, Shane, and grandson, Tanner. Tanner went on to win the NHRA Pro Stock title in 2018 before moving on to stock car racing.

NASCAR
In January 2021, Gray partnered with David Gilliland Racing (DGR) to compete in the NASCAR Camping World Truck Series, ARCA Menards Series and the CARS Late Model Stock Tour with factory support from Ford Performance.

Personal life
Johnny Gray was the son of John R. and Bobby Dawn (née Till) Gray.  His father was a self-made oil industry titan in New Mexico and north Texas regions.

Johnny Gray was president of Marbob Energy, the New Mexico oil producer co-founded by his father. Gray and his sister sold the company in 2010 for $1.7 billion in proceeds.

References

NASCAR team owners
1953 births
Living people